Δ4-Tibolone (developmental code name ORG-OM-38), also known as 7α-methylnorethisterone or as 7α-methyl-17α-ethynyl-19-nortestosterone, is a synthetic androgen and progestin which was never marketed. The compound is a major active metabolite of tibolone, which itself is a prodrug of δ4-tibolone along with 3α-hydroxytibolone and 3β-hydroxytibolone (which, in contrast to δ4-tibolone, are estrogens). Tibolone and δ4-tibolone are thought to be responsible for the androgenic and progestogenic activity of tibolone, while 3α-hydroxytibolone and 3β-hydroxytibolone are thought to be responsible for its estrogenic activity.

See also
 List of androgens/anabolic steroids
 List of progestogens

References

{{DISPLAYTITLE:Δ4-Tibolone}}

Abandoned drugs
Tertiary alcohols
Alkene derivatives
Ethynyl compounds
Androgens and anabolic steroids
Estranes
Human drug metabolites
Ketones
Progestogens